The Lebanese Red Cross (LRC) (al-Ṣalīb al-aḥmar al-lubnānī)  is a humanitarian organization and an auxiliary team to the medical service of the Lebanese Army. Its headquarters is in the Lebanese capital city of Beirut. Founded in 1945, the organization comprises a number of approximately 7,000 members/volunteers and 200 staff personnel. The society works with the International Federation and the ICRC, and on a bilateral basis with the Norwegian and the French Red Cross. The LRC also works with the relevant components of the Lebanese authorities, with UN agencies and NGOs.

On account of its Christian majority until an indeterminate point in the third quarter of the 20th century, Lebanon is the only Arab League member state to use the Red Cross as its symbol; the remainder use the Red Crescent.

The Lebanese Red Cross is led by Secretary General Georges Kettaneh.

History
The LRC was established on July 9, 1945 as an independent national society. A year later, it was recognized by the State as a public non-profit organization and as an auxiliary team to the medical service of the Lebanese Army. In 1947, it became a member of the International Federation of Red Cross and Red Crescent Societies and joined the International Red Cross and Red Crescent Movement. In addition, the LRC is a founding member of the Secretariat General of the Organization of the Arab Red Crescent and Red Cross Societies. 

After the Lebanese Civil War period, the LRC had to reposition its services towards postwar requirements. In 1993, the society established a long-term development plan leading up to 2000, and an extension plan in 2002 (to cover the period up until 2005).

The LRC work under seven fundamental principles: Humanity - Impartiality - Neutrality - Independence - Voluntary Service - Unity - Universality.

The LRC can be reached via the free hotline 140.

Mission

The mission of the LRC is to spread and promote peace, serve the society, alleviate human pain without any discrimination as to nationality, political commitments or social class. The National Society has a leading national role in first aid and ambulance services, as well as providing blood, primary health, and social services. The Lebanese Red Cross Society is led by volunteers, whose mission is to provide relief to victims of natural and human made disasters, and help people prevent, prepare for and respond to emergencies, and to mitigate the suffering of the most vulnerable. The LRC's mission includes the following programs and units:

 50 Medical - Social Center
 46 First Aid centers
 30 Chapters or local committee
 33 Youth Clubs
 13 Mobile Clinics
 13 Blood Transfusion centers
 6 Nursing Institutes
 2 Health Assistant schools
 1 Safety & Security Unit
 1 Orthopedic workshop

Organizational structure
The LRC consists of  the president, the General Assembly, where the ultimate authority rests, the central committee composed of 42 volunteers members, the Executive Committee composed of 9 member heads of the active departments at the LRC (in addition to the President, the Vice-president and the treasurer).

The LRC also includes the following departments:
 Safety & Security
 Planning & Development
 Internal Affairs
 Finance & Management
 Treasury
 Supply & Logistics
 Public Relations & Communications
 Medical & Social Services
 Blood Transfusion Banks
 First Aid
 Teaching
 Youth
 Volunteers

Activities
Concerning disaster preparedness and response, the LRC first-aid and ambulance teams are the only national ambulance service covering the whole of the Lebanese territory. The service operates over 250 ambulances, with 16 permanent staff and 2,000 volunteers on a continuous basis in 46 first-aid centres. Services are managed through a radio communication system from four central operation rooms, one in the capital city of Beirut, one in Tibnin in the South, one in Tripoli, and the last in the Bekaa. The first-aid and ambulance organization represents the backbone of emergency medical disaster preparedness in the country. Young volunteers from all religions and social groups are united in their work under the Red Cross emblem.

Future
The Lebanese Red Cross plans to strengthen its position and cover other areas, such as road safety, disaster preparedness, preventive health-care services, and youth and volunteer activities which are essential in order to promote humanitarian values among the new generation of citizens. Thus, in accordance with the International Federation Strategy 2010, the LRC established development plan with annual plans of action in order to reach the objectives. Its major priorities include continuing the implementation of institutional changes based on the organizational development program, focusing on the governance structure by reviewing the organization and establishing a long-term development plan, develop resource management strategies in order to become economically self-sufficient, and to support and further develop the activities and recruitment of volunteers in the National Society through various Red Cross activities and services.

See also
 International Committee of the Red Cross
 International Red Cross and Red Crescent Movement

References

External links
 Lebanese Red Cross

Red Cross and Red Crescent national societies
1945 establishments in Lebanon
Medical and health organisations based in Lebanon
Organisations based in Beirut
Organizations established in 1945